Howard Barton Unruh (January 21, 1921 – October 19, 2009) was an American mass murderer who shot and killed thirteen people during a twelve-minute walk through his neighborhood in Camden, New Jersey, on September 6, 1949 in an incident that became known as the Walk of Death. Unruh was found to be criminally insane and died in 2009 after a lengthy illness at the age of 88 following 60 years of confinement.

His shooting spree is the deadliest mass shooting by a lone perpetrator in New Jersey history.

Background and possible motives for killings
Howard Unruh was the son of Samuel Shipley Unruh and Freda E. Vollmer. He had a younger brother, James; they were raised by their mother after their parents separated. Unruh grew up in East Camden, New Jersey, attended Cramer Junior High School and graduated from Woodrow Wilson High School in January 1939. The Woodrow Wilson High School yearbook from 1939 indicated that he was shy and that his ambition was to become a government employee.

Unruh enlisted in the United States Army on October 27, 1942, and saw active service as an armor crewman across Europe between October 1944 and July 1945. He was remembered by his section chief, Norman E. Koehn, as a first-class soldier who never drank, swore, or chased girls and spent much time reading his Bible and writing long letters to his mother. It was also cited that Unruh kept meticulous notes on the enemies killed in battles, down to the details of the corpses. He was awarded the European Theater of Operations Medal, the Victory Medal, and the Good Conduct Medal. Unruh was honorably discharged at the end of the war and returned to New Jersey to live with his mother. Both his brother and his father later indicated that Unruh's wartime experiences had changed him, making him moody, nervous, and detached.

Unruh briefly found work as a sheet-metal worker before enrolling at the Temple University School of Pharmacy in Philadelphia but quit after a month citing "poor physical condition" as the reason. Supported by his mother's income working in a soap factory, he hung about their house, decorating it with his medals, reading his Bible, and practicing his shooting in the basement, which he'd turned into a practice range.

It was around this time that Unruh's relations with his neighbors began to deteriorate and his resentment grew over what he regarded as "derogatory remarks made about my character." His brother James pointed to an ongoing feud between Unruh and his neighbor, pharmacist Maurice Cohen, over Unruh's use of Cohen's backyard as a means to access his apartment. Prior to the killings, Unruh went to a movie theater in Philadelphia and sat through several shows before returning home around 3 a.m. He had gone to the theater to meet a man, with whom he’d been having a weeks-long affair, for a date, but was delayed and arrived to find that the man had gone. Upon his return home, a gate he had installed that day had been removed.

Shootings
At approximately 7 a.m. on September 6, 1949, Unruh ate a breakfast prepared by his mother, who then left to visit a neighbor, Carolina Pinner. At about 9:20 a.m., armed with his Luger P08 pistol, an eight-round magazine, and more ammunition carried in his pockets, he left his apartment and walked out onto River Road in Camden. Approaching a bread-delivery truck, Unruh shoved his pistol through the door and shot at the driver. He missed his shot by a few inches and the driver unsuccessfully attempted to warn residents.

Unruh visited the shop of one of his neighbors, shoemaker John Pilarchik, whom he shot and killed instantly. He next visited the barbershop of another neighbor, Clark Hoover, who was cutting the hair of six-year-old Orris Smith; shooting Hoover in the head and Smith in the neck, both fatally. Running to Cohen's pharmacy, Unruh encountered insurance man James Hutton and killed him when he didn't move out of his way.

Unruh proceeded to the rear of the pharmacy and saw Cohen and his wife Rose running up the stairs into their apartment. Once in the apartment, Cohen climbed through a window and onto the porch roof, while Rose hid herself and their son, 12-year-old Charles, in separate closets. However, Unruh discovered the closet Rose was hiding in and shot three times through the door before opening it and firing once more into her face. Walking across the apartment, he spotted Cohen's mother Minnie, age 63, trying to call the police, and shot her several times. He then followed Cohen onto a porch roof and shot him in the back, causing him to fall to the pavement below. Charles, still hiding in the second closet, managed to escape undetected.

Unruh then walked into the middle of River Road and fired at an approaching sedan, killing the driver, Alvin Day, and causing the car to careen onto the sidewalk. He then visited the business of tailor Thomas Zegrino; he was not there, but his wife Helga was and was killed by the gunman. Zegrino would be the only one of Unruh's intended targets to survive the rampage.

After firing through the locked front door of a grocery store, Unruh approached a car waiting at the intersection and shot the occupants: Helen Wilson, her son John, and mother Emma Matlack; the two women died instantly, while the boy died later at Cooper Hospital. Unruh then fired through an apartment window, killing two-year-old Thomas Hamilton. The child's caregiver, Irene Rice, collapsed upon witnessing the shooting and was treated for severe shock. Unruh would later claim that he didn't know who he saw in the window or whether he hit them. Unruh next fired upon another car coming down the street; its occupants, Charles Peterson and James Crawford, managed to escape to a nearby tavern and survived.

Witness William McNeely saw Frank Engel run out of the tavern and shoot at Unruh, but he apparently missed and then ran back inside. In fact, he had succeeded in shooting Unruh in the leg, which police would only discover at the end of a lengthy interview with Unruh. Unruh fired at several other people across the street, missing them. He then found Madeline Harris and her son Armand outside their home hanging out blankets to dry and shot at them; both were injured but survived.

Hearing police sirens in the distance, Unruh returned to his apartment, which was soon surrounded by police. The first officer on the scene was Detective William E. Kelly, Sr. A gunfight ensued, during which journalist Philip Buxton of the Camden Evening Courier found Unruh's number in the local telephone directory and dialled it. Unruh answered in what was described as "a strong, clear voice" and had the following conversation with Buxton:

"Is this Howard?"
"Yes ... what's the last name of the party you want?"
"Unruh."
(Pause) "What's the last name of the party you want?"
"Unruh. I'm a friend, and I want to know what they're doing to you."
"They're not doing a damned thing to me, but I'm doing plenty to them."
(In a soothing, reassuring voice) "How many have you killed?"
"I don't know yet, because I haven't counted them ... (pause) but it looks like a pretty good score."
"Why are you killing people?"
"I don't know. I can't answer that yet, I'm too busy."
(At that point Buxton heard Unruh move away from the phone as gunfire was heard in the background)
"I'll have to talk to you later ... a couple of friends are coming to get me" ... (voice trails off).

The gunfight ended when police threw two tear gas bombs into the apartment, the second of which went off, filling the room with gas. Two armed officers, patrolman Charles Hance and Captain Everett Joslin, went up to the first floor of the building and shouted, "Come down with your hands up" to which Unruh replied, "I give up. Don't shoot." Unruh emerged from the room and stumbled down the stairs, fell at the feet of the officers, and was handcuffed by Sergeant Earl Wright. 

Detectives found an apartment filled with what was described as an arsenal of weapons, guns, knives, bullet-making equipment, and more than 700 rounds. In a drawer were several marksmanship medals and in the basement was Unruh's target range. On a table was a Bible opened to Matthew, Chapter 24. Police also found books relating to sex hygiene.

Arrest and incarceration
Under police interrogation, Unruh gave a meticulous account of his actions, which was later released by Camden County prosecutor Mitchell Cohen (no relation to Maurice Cohen). Only at the end of this interrogation did police discover that Unruh had a bullet wound in his left thigh. He was subsequently taken to Cooper Hospital for treatment, where his thirteenth victim, John Wilson, was already dying.

Charges were filed for thirteen counts of "willful and malicious slayings with malice aforethought" and three counts of "atrocious assault and battery." Unruh was eventually diagnosed with paranoid schizophrenia by psychologists and found to be insane, making him immune to criminal prosecution. When he was able to leave Cooper Hospital, Unruh was sent to the New Jersey Hospital for the Insane (now Trenton Psychiatric Hospital), to be held in a private cell in the maximum-security Vroom Building. He remained incarcerated there until his death in 2009. Unruh's last public words, made during an interview with a psychologist, were, "I'd have killed a thousand if I had enough bullets."

Victims
Unruh killed 13 and injured three. Those killed, and their ages, are listed below:

John Joseph Pilarchik, 27
Orris Martin Smith, 6
Clark Hoover, 45
James Hutton, 46
Rose Cohen, 38
Minnie Cohen, 63
Dr. Maurice J. Cohen, 39
Alvin Day, 24
Thomas Hamilton, 2
Helga Kautzach Zegrino, 28
Emma Matlack, 68
Helen Wilson, 37
John Wilson, 9

Miscellaneous
Maurice and Rose Cohen's son Charles, then aged 12, survived the murder of his family by hiding in a closet. Charles H. Cohen (January 31, 1937 – September 4, 2009) was the maternal grandfather of Carly Novell, who survived the February 14, 2018, shooting incident at Marjory Stoneman Douglas High School in Parkland, Florida, by hiding in a closet like her grandfather did in 1949. Charles Cohen died at the age of 72 on September 4, 2009, and was buried two days later on September 6, 2009 (on the 60th anniversary of the mass murder and just one month before Unruh's death).

Meyer Berger of The New York Times won the 1950 Pulitzer Prize for Local Reporting for his 4,000-word story on the killings.

See also
 List of rampage killers
 Gun violence in the United States
 Mass shootings in the United States
 Ernest Ingenito (1924—1995) another New Jersey-based spree killer

Notes

References

External links
 The Quiet One, Time Magazine (September 19, 1949)
 A Portrait of the Jersey mass killer as an old man, The New York Times (March 8, 1982)
 Sixty years ago today, a Camden gunman killed 13, The Philadelphia Inquirer (September 6, 2009)
 Howard Unruh, 88, Dies; Killed 13 of His Neighbors in Camden in 1949, The New York Times'' (October 19, 2009)
 Howard Unruh – 1939 Woodrow Wilson High School yearbook entry
Life Magazine September 19, 1949

1921 births
2009 deaths
1949 murders in the United States
United States Army personnel of World War II
American murderers of children
People acquitted by reason of insanity
People acquitted of murder
People acquitted of assault
American mass murderers
People from Camden, New Jersey
Woodrow Wilson High School (New Jersey) alumni
United States Army soldiers
Military personnel from New Jersey
20th-century American criminals
American male criminals
Mass shootings in the United States
People with schizophrenia
LGBT people from New Jersey
20th-century LGBT people